The 1998 FIFA World Cup AFC–OFC qualification play-off was a two-legged home-and-away tie between the winners of the Oceania qualifying tournament, Australia, and the losing team in the AFC play-off from the Asian qualifying tournament, Iran. The games were played on 22 and 29 November 1997 in Tehran and Melbourne respectively. Australia was hoping to play in the FIFA World Cup for the first time since 1974 and Iran in 1978.

Background

Play-off match

First leg
Prior to arrival in Tehran, Terry Venables and others involved in the Australian national team had made negative comments about Iran, stating it as being dangerous, and going so far as to bring their own drinking water for their stay.

The first leg of the play-off, on 22 November 1997, took place in Tehran, Iran, with the result a 1–1 draw. Attendance for this match was extremely high, as 128,000 fans packed Azadi Stadium, despite it only having a capacity for 100,000 fans at the time.

Second leg
The second leg, held on 29 November at the Melbourne Cricket Ground, had a crowd of 85,022. With Australia holding a 1–0 lead at half-time and scoring a second goal just after the break, it looked likely that they would progress to the World Cup. Immediately following Australia's second goal, spectator Peter Hore, known for disrupting major events, ran onto the field and cut up Iran's goal net, causing a halt in play. However, Australia's dominance continued until a controversial booking of Harry Kewell following a collision with Iranian goalkeeper Ahmad Reza Abedzadeh in the 72nd minute.  This seemed to quell the Australians' momentum, as an Iranian revival, led by Khodadad Azizi, saw Iran score two quick goals to make the score 3–3 on aggregate, with Iran progressing on away goals.  

Despite being undefeated throughout their entire qualifying campaign, Australia had again failed to qualify for the World Cup finals.  Along with host nation and eventual winner France (who as host nation did not need to qualify), and Saint Kitts and Nevis, Australia were one of three teams to not lose a game in the entire campaign. The broadcast of the game on SBS featured closing comments from a clearly distraught Les Murray and Johnny Warren, with Warren openly weeping on air. In 2000, coach Terry Venables said the game was "one of the saddest sporting moments of my life."

Broadcasting rights

Asia & Oceania

Europa

Africa

Americas  
   Latin America: Setanta Sports (First leg only) and PSN (Second leg only) 
  Brazil: NexTV! (only first leg are broadcast live) and Rede Record (only second leg are broadcast live); PSN 2 Brasil (Only first leg are broadcast live) and SporTV 2 (Only second leg are broadcast live) 
  Canada: 
  Puerto Rico:  
  United States:

References

External links
10th Anniversary of Melbourne Showdown, IranSportsPress.com
First leg
Second leg

Play
4
1997
1997
1998
Play
1997 in Australian soccer
20th century in Tehran
1990s in Melbourne
November 1997 sports events in Australia
November 1997 sports events in Asia
International association football competitions hosted by Australia
International association football competitions hosted by Iran